Quittet is a surname. Notable people with the surname include:

 Alain Quittet (born 1956), French sports shooter and Paralympic road cyclist
 Catherine Quittet (born 1964), French skier
 Claude Quittet (born 1941), French footballer

French-language surnames